Victorian majolica properly refers to two types of majolica made in the second half of the 19th century in Europe and America.

Firstly, and best known, there is the mass-produced majolica decorated with coloured lead glazes, made in Britain, Europe and the US; typically hard-wearing, surfaces moulded in relief, vibrant translucent glazes, in occasionally classical but mostly naturalistic styles, often with an element of High Victorian whimsy.

Secondly, there is the much less common tin-glazed majolica made primarily by Mintons from 1848 to circa 1880, typically with flat surfaces, opaque white glaze with fine brush painted decoration in imitation of the Italian Renaissance maiolica process and styles.

Glazes
Glaze is a vitreous coating on a ceramic. Types of  glazing include feldspathic or alkali-glazed, salt-glazed, lead-glazed, and tin-glazed.

Lead oxide is a key ingredient of both lead and tin glazes. Lead oxide is a flux that causes lead and tin glazes to fuse to the earthenware biscuit body at a low oven temperature, about 800 °C. The other ingredients in lead and tin glazes are typically an equally large quantity of silicates, and a small proportion of alkali (feldspar or similar) ground up with a little water and the large proportion of lead oxide to form a paste.

A coloured glaze results from adding a small amount of particular metal oxides to plain lead glaze, different metal oxides producing different colours. Since mid-19th century coloured glazes earthenware has been known as majolica.

An opaque white tin-glaze results from adding a small amount of tin oxide to plain lead glaze. Decorated with brush-painted enamels, tin-glazed earthenware from mid-15th century onwards has been known as maiolica, also later as faience, delftware, talavera, or rarely majolica, though commonly majolica in USA.

Coloured glazes
majolica n. 1. is earthenware decorated with coloured lead glazes applied directly to an unglazed body. Victorian majolica is the familiar mass-produced earthenware decorated with coloured lead glazes made during the Victorian era (1837-1900) in Britain, Europe and the US, typically hard-wearing, surfaces frequently moulded in relief, vibrant translucent glazes, in a variety of styles and forms (some examples below). Shown in Britain at the Exhibitions of 1851 and 1862, it became fashionable, widely copied and mass-produced world-wide. Also known as: maiolica, Palissy ware, coloured glazes majolica, coloured-glazed majolica, lead-glazed majolica, and misleadingly 'lead or tin glazed' majolica.

Some coloured glazes majolica was produced in traditional Classical or Revivalist styles, but Darwinism, natural history, their English country gardens, expeditions abroad, and trade in oriental products generated more exciting styles appealing to the upcoming merchant classes. There was a boom in Naturalistic pottery, often with an element of whimsy, to which Minton's inexpensive, durable, multi-purpose product was well suited. A strong interest in the world at large generated passing fashions for Egyptian forms, Japanese styles, Chinoiserie and High Victorian style. Conservatories became a fashion statement. Adorning them were spectacular majolica garden seats, flower pots, jardinières, stands, large birds and animals. The irrepressible urge to impress guests with rare food led to the growing of pineapples and egg-plants (aubergines) formerly only available overseas. These too appeared as decorative objects for admiration around the home. Minton's Palissy ware boomed. Pottery makers throughout Britain, Europe and the US copied the process with great success, albeit variable quality. Palissy ware/Majolica went global.

Tin-glaze
majolica n. 2. is earthenware, coated with opaque white tin-glaze and ornamented with metallic oxide colours. Tin-glazed Victorian majolica is the rare tin-glazed earthenware made primarily by Mintons from 1848 to circa 1880, typically with flat surfaces, and opaque whitish glaze with brush painted decoration in the style(s) of Italian Renaissance maiolica tin-glazed pottery. Also known as: maiolica; and 'lead or tin' glazed majolica.

Minton's tin-glazed majolica in imitation of Italian maiolica, praised at Exhibitions and purchased by Royalty and museums, made little commercial impact. Other pottery makers shunned the process.

Interest in Renaissance styles was waning, fashion moving on with the usual protestations from older generations: "...the current of fashion, however contrary to right, wisdom, and good taste..."

Cost of production was high. Compared to the lead-glaze process whereby thick, temperature-compatible coloured lead glazes were applied direct to the biscuit, simultaneously, then fired, (paint, fire), the tin-glaze process required extra stages for dipping/coating and drying the tin-glaze before decoration could even begin, (dip, dry, paint, fire). Added to this, the expense of brushwork decoration, especially the fine painting of pictures and designs, was very time-consuming, requiring highly skilled, higher paid artists.

Meanings of majolica
The term majolica has been dogged by confusion starting with the English anglicisation of the word maiolica into majolica following the appearance of the letter j in the English alphabet mid-17th century.

Leon Arnoux, the artistic and technical director of Mintons, wrote in 1852 "We understand by majolica a pottery formed of a calcareous clay gently fired, and covered with an opaque enamel composed of sand, lead, and tin..."
He was describing the Minton & Co. tin-glazed product made in imitation of Italian maiolica both in process and in styles. Remember, tin-glaze is simply plain lead glaze with a little tin oxide added. His description is often referenced, in error, as a definition of Minton's other new product, the much copied and later mass-produced ceramic sensation of the Victorian era, Minton's coloured lead glazes 'Palissy ware'. The 16th century French pottery of Bernard Palissy was well known and much admired. Mintons adopted the name 'Palissy ware' for their new coloured glazes product, but this soon became known also as majolica. Minton & Co. appear to have done little to promote the clear distinction between their tin-glazed and coloured glazes products.

Minton archive first design for majolica
Thomas Kirkby's design G144 in the Minton Archive is inscribed "This is the First Design for Majolica ...". The design is Italian Renaissance in style. Close-up images illustrate a design suited for fine brushwork on flat surfaces. The design is for Minton's rare tin-glaze Majolica imitation of Italian tin-glaze maiolica. Minton's designs for Palissy ware, also known as majolica, were suited for 'thick' painting of coloured lead glazes onto surfaces moulded in relief to make best use of the intaglio effect.

English Makers

Minton, the Originator

Great Exhibition (1851)

Victorian majolica was originated by Minton & Co., first exhibited at the Great Exhibition of 1851.

 
The 1851 Exhibition Catalogue lists the two Victorian majolica products by Minton in consecutive sections.

Earthenware [...] Flowerpots, etc.
Exhibit Number 60. "A variety of [...] flowerpots and stands, and garden seats." refers to the coloured glazes product that Mintons called Palissy ware.

Tiles, Terra Cotta, and Vases, etc, in imitation of Majolica Ware.
Exhibit Number 74. "Variety of flowerpots and stands, coloured in the majolica style, etc." refers to the tin-glazed product painted with enamels that Mintons called Majolica.

Exposition Universelle (1855)
The Illustrated London News reported with approval on Minton's two new products shown in Paris:

The collection of Palissy and Majolica ware, however, is that which appears to have created the greatest sensation among Parisian connoisseurs. The reader will remember that the main difference in these wares is that whereas the Palissy ware is coloured by a transparent glaze, Majolica ware contains the colour (opaque) in the material. The care and taste with which these manufactures have been brought by the Messrs. Minton to their present state of perfection, have been amply rewarded. Within a few days of the opening of the Exhibition all the specimens exhibited had been sold.

Despite this reminder Minton's Palissy Ware became known as 'majolica ware'; 'Palissy ware' dropped out of use and 'majolica' stuck. In the 1870s, the curators of the South Kensington Museum (now the V&A) tried to clear up the confusion by reviving the Italian spelling 'maiolica' with an 'i' instead of a 'j' for Italian tin-glaze.

Great Exhibition (1862)
At the second Great Exhibition of the Art-Works of All Nations a range of Minton's products were exhibited and illustrated in the Exhibition Catalogue. Amongst them were the two Minton majolicas a) tin-glazed Minton Majolica and b) coloured glazes Minton Palissy ware soon known also as 'majolica'.

Wedgwood
 
Wedgwood began to manufacture majolica about ten years after Mintons. Wedgwood's glazes and modelling were denser and more formal than Minton's, but there were many pieces that displayed the naturalism and humour of Minton shapes. Wedgwood's majolica included cachepots, jugs, candlesticks, cheese bells, umbrella stands, sardine boxes, plates in naturalistic patterns, bread trays, etc. In Wedgwood's "greenware" the green glaze emphasizes the low relief patterning, typically of basketwork and foliage. Numerous smaller factories in the Staffordshire Potteries specialised in such green majolica wares in which the translucent glaze brought out the low relief of the cast body: some, like Wedgwood, marked their majolica with impressed stamps.

Majolica was influenced by the design of the old "Cauliflower" and "Pineapple" teapots that had been made by Thomas Whieldon, Wedgwood and other 18th-century Staffordshire potters. Both English and American majolica potters reproduced the "Cauliflower" pattern and other raised fruit, vegetable, leaf, and berry patterns, with green, yellow, pink, brown, light blue and purple-blue glazes. There is also a teapot of yellow corn and green leaves, similar to the old Whieldon "Pineapple" teapots, and a teapot, jug and sugar bowl of pink coral and green seaweed with accents of brown and blue, marked "Etruscan Majolica". Many late 19th-century majolica designs had rustic motifs with backgrounds of basketry and wooden-bound buckets decorated with moulded flowers, birds, fish and animals. Handles were made to resemble tree branches, rose stems and twined flowers and leaves.

Plates, jugs, teapots and other articles were moulded with the shapes of wild roses, lily pads and herons, begonia leaves, shells, coral, seaweed, corn and bamboo stalks, cabbage leaves, strawberries, ferns and sprays of flowers, borders of basketry and oriental motifs.

George Jones

The Trent Pottery, George Jones and Sons, made majolica cupids, shells, dolphins, birds, figurines and coral designs in numerous shapes including highbrow centrepieces alongside snuff boxes, spittoons, dog bowls, vases, serving dishes, tea sets, jugs, cheese keeps, desk sets, garden seats and pie dishes. Their mark was a monogram of the initials "G.J." joined together. A beehive bread dish with a cover has a design of wild roses against a background of basketwork and has the Trent Pottery mark. Also flowerpots were made in bright colours and with raised designs of natural flowers.

Joseph Holdcroft
 Joseph Holdcroft of Longton.

Brownfield

Brown Westhead Moore
 Brown-Westhead, Moore & Co

Copeland

 Copeland & Garrett., successors to Josiah Spode

Thomas Forester

 Thomas Forester & Sons

Samuel Lear

 Samuel Lear

 Poole and Unwin

Fielding
 S.Fielding and Co., The Railway Pottery, Stoke on Trent
 Daniel Sutherland and Sons
 James Woodward

Adams & Bromley

 J.W. John Adams and Co., Hanley

 Edge, Malkin & Co, Burslem

Royal Worcester

Doulton Lambeth

Victoria Pottery Company
 Victoria Pottery

John Roth
 J. Roth

European and American makers
Majolica from other countries is included in this article for two reasons
 The term Victorian is occasionally used also to describe majolica made in other countries.
 European and American makers employed English immigrant technicians and copied Minton's Victorian coloured glazes majolica process and styles.

France
APT

Barbizet

Brard

Delphin Massier

Perret-Gentil

Sarreguemines
La majolique
"A la fin des années 1870 apparaît un produit qui renforce la notoriété de Sarreguemines en Europe:la majolique.Il s’agit d’une faïence fine recouverte de glaçures colorées. Les couleurs privilégiées: le gros bleu, le bleu turquoise, le vert dit bronze. Les bibelots, « objets de fantaisie » ainsi que certaines pièces monumentales bénéficient largement de cette nouvelle technique."

Thomas Sergent

Choisy le Roi

Boch Freres

Longchamp

Luneville

Orchies

Nimy

Onnaing

Salins

Vallauris

Portugal

Augusta Baptista de Carvalho

Avelena Soares

Bordalo Pinheiro

Cunha

José Francisco de Sousa

Manuel Cipriano Gomes Mafra

Germany
Krause (Germany, now in Poland) Reichard Krause, quality German maker late 19th century, coloured majolica glazes, styles classical and naturalistic, usually with clear K/M shield makers marks.

Eichwald

Bloch, Villeroy & Boch (Luxemburg)

W S Schiller

Austria
Hugo Lonitz

Sweden
Gustafsberg

Rörstrand

America

Several American firms also made majolica, with the English born Edwin Bennett producing it in Baltimore as early as the 1850s. The best known are Griffin, Smith and Hill of Phoenixville, Pennsylvania, whose Etruscan majolica made from 1880 to 1890 includes compotes with dolphin supports and flower, shell, or jewel cups, a design of coral weed and seashells, and tableware with leaves and ferns. Their mark was an impressed monogram, "G.S.H.", sometimes circled and with the words "Etruscan Majolica".

Majolica was also made by Odell and Booth at Tarrytown, New York, and by the Faience Manufacturing Company at Greenpoint, Long Island, whose mark is an incised "F.M. Co." Their pottery was dipped in coloured glazes, creating a streaked or marbled effect. Majolica was made at Evansville, Indiana. Work from the Chesapeake Pottery in Baltimore was called Clifton Ware and was marked "Clifton Decor 'R' " with the monogram "D.F.H.".

The Arsenal Pottery of Trenton, New Jersey, was making majolica as late as 1900 and exhibited Toby jugs in imitation of English Toby jugs at the World's Columbian Exposition, Chicago (1893)

See also

Majolica
Maiolica
Tin-glazed pottery

Notes

References
 Arnoux, Leon, British Manufacturing Industries, Gutenberg, 1877. 
 Karmason, Marylin J., and Stacke, Joan B., Majolica: A Complete History and Illustrated Survey, 1989, Harry N. Abrams, Inc.
 Atterbury, Paul, and Batkin, Margaret, Dictionary of Minton, Antique Collectors' Club, 1990.
 Katz Marks, Mariann, "The Collector's Encyclopedia of Majolica", Collector Books
 Schneider, M. Majolica. Pennsylvania: Schiffer Publishing, Ltd. 1999.

External links

"In Depth: Minton Majolica", Mintons archive, with large range of designs online
 Old and Sold
 The Majolica Society
 The Minton Archive
 Potteries Museum and Art Gallery, Stoke-on-Trent, UK

English pottery
American pottery
French pottery
Austrian pottery
Types of pottery decoration
Pottery